The 1958–59 St. John's Redmen basketball team represented St. John's University during the 1958–59 NCAA Division I college basketball season. The team was coached by Joseph Lapchick in his fourteenth year at the school and also was the first season Lou Carnesecca joined the basketball program as an assistant coach. The team was a member of the Metropolitan New York Conference. During this time the university was transitioning from Brooklyn to Queens, so the basketball team played their home games at Martin Van Buren High School in Queens, NY and Madison Square Garden in Manhattan while their new on campus arena, Alumni Hall, was being built.

Roster

Schedule and results

|-
!colspan=9 style="background:#FF0000; color:#FFFFFF;"| Regular Season

|-
!colspan=9 style="background:#FF0000; color:#FFFFFF;"| NIT

Team players drafted into the NBA

References

St. John's Red Storm men's basketball seasons
St. John's
St. John's
National Invitation Tournament championship seasons
St. John's Redmen bask
St. John's Redmen bask